Utavali River is a river in western India in Gujarat whose origin is Kaniad hills. Its basin has a maximum length of 125 km. The total catchment area of the basin is 388 km2.

References

Rivers of Gujarat
Rivers of India